Hamza Zakari (born 4 July 1994) is a Ghanaian professional football midfielder who plays for Great Olympics.

Career
Zakari played a match in 2013–14 UEFA Europa League: with Tromsø, he was on the pitch in the 0–1 loss against Anzhi Makhachkala. He played 9 matches for Icelandic side Selfoss.

References

External links
 
 Hamza Zakari at La Preferente

Living people
1994 births
Ghanaian footballers
Challenger Pro League players
K.A.S. Eupen players
Tromsø IL players
Elche CF Ilicitano footballers
Selfoss men's football players
Accra Great Olympics F.C. players
Expatriate footballers in Belgium
Expatriate footballers in Norway
Expatriate footballers in Iceland
Expatriate footballers in Spain
Ghanaian expatriate sportspeople in Belgium
Ghanaian expatriate sportspeople in Norway
Ghanaian expatriate sportspeople in Spain
Association football midfielders